Lan-sin Lu-nge Aphwe was a youth organization in Socialist Republic of the Union of Burma (present-day Myanmar) for high school and university students to learn  useful skills and about the socialist politics of the Burma Socialist Programme Party. It consisted of three main branches: Tei-za Lu-nge, Shei-hsaung Lu-nge and Lan-sin Lu-nge. Teiza Lu-nge wore blue scarf and Shei-hsaung Lu-nge wore the Red scarf.

Establishment
The Revolutionary Government of the Union of Burma dissolved the Union of Burma Boy Scouts and Girl Guides (UBBSGG), Lieutenant Ye Htoon, the Director General of the UBBSGG, reported on 1 March 1964. The Revolutionary Government had seized the UBBSGG and the assets of the UBBSGG were turned over to the Ministry of Education, which was authorized to form the Lan-sin Lu-nge Aphwe (Programme Youth Organization).

Structure
Students were required to join the organisation.

Within the organization of the Lan-sin Lu-nge Aphwe, လမ်းစဉ်လူငယ်အဖွဲ့ (Programme Youth Organization), three branches were formed according to the age group and intellectual differences;

 Tei-za Lu-nge, တေဇလူငယ် (Glorious Youth) for primary school students (5–10 years old),
 Shei-hsaung Lu-nge, ရှေ့ဆောင်လူငယ် (Pioneer Youth) for middle and high school students (11–15 years old), and 
 Lan-sin Lu-nge, လမ်းစဉ်လူငယ် (Programme Youth) for college or university students of age of 16–18 years old.

After reaching the age of 18, they could become "candidate member of the party". Then starting at the age of 21 years old, a candidate member could apply application forms to become a "fully-fledged party member".
 
In 1981, only 6.19% of members of Programme Youth Organization who had reached the age of 18 or above, joined the Burma Socialist Programme Party. This was a striking situation for the party. Thus, to persuade more youths to the organization and the party, Programme Youth Organizing Committees were opened on the campuses of the universities, institutes and colleges.

Tei-za Lu-nge (Glorious Youth)

Origin of name
Named after General Aung San's Nom de guerre ဗိုလ်တေဇ(Bo Teiza)

Membership age group
5 to 10 years old

Uniform

Badge

The upper-half picture of General Aung San was used as a badge. 
 To become heroic good sons and good daughters of the nation as General Aung San did.
 To continue the programme that General Aung San planned.

Flag

The flag must have a length of 5 ft and width of 3 ft, sky blue background with a big white star on upper left.
 The white star indicates the meaning of forever shining and forever preserving the independence
 The blue background indicates the meaning of steady, peaceful and pleasurable.

Shei-hsaung Lu-nge (Pioneer Youth)

Origin of name
Named as a pioneer movement

Membership age group
11 to 15 years old

Uniform

Lan-sin Lu-nge (Programme Youth)

Origin of name
Named after short name of Burma Socialist Programme Party လမ်းစဉ်ပါတီ(Lan-sin Party)

Membership age group
16 to 18 years old

Uniform

Legacy
According to the Political Pension Law of 1980, those who served in the Organizing Central Committee as chairman, vice-chairman, secretary, associate secretary, and committee member (full time) get political pension according to their positions as described in that law.

The Burma Socialist Programme Party had been dissolved on 24 September 1988. But the Programme Youth Organizations seem to be remained. The Lan-sin Lu-nges were seen in the first episode of a military propaganda series for honouring 47th Anniversary of the Armed Forces Day, that aired in 1992.

The Government of the Republic of the Union of Myanmar ordered the Ministry of Education to found the Myanmar Scouts Association in 2012, and students' Scouts Associations were founded in 20 schools as of December 2020.

Notes

References

Pioneer movement
Youth organisations based in Myanmar
Youth organizations established in 1964